The Courtship of Miles Standish is an 1858 narrative poem by American poet Henry Wadsworth Longfellow about the early days of Plymouth Colony, the colonial settlement established in America by the Mayflower Pilgrims.

Overview

The Courtship of Miles Standish is set in the year 1621 against the backdrop of a fierce Indian war and focuses on a love triangle among three Mayflower passengers: Miles Standish, Priscilla Mullins, and John Alden. Longfellow said that the story was true, but the historical evidence is inconclusive.

The poem was a literary counterpoint to Longfellow's earlier Evangeline (1847), the tragic tale of a woman whose lover disappears during the deportation of the Acadian people in 1755. Together, Evangeline and The Courtship of Miles Standish captured the bittersweet quality of America's colonial era. However, the plot of The Courtship of Miles Standish deliberately varies in emotional tone, unlike the steady tragedy of Longfellow's Evangeline. The Pilgrims grimly battle against disease and Indians, but are also obsessed with an eccentric love triangle, creating a curious mix of drama and comedy.  Bumbling, feuding roommates Miles Standish and John Alden vie for the affections of the beautiful Priscilla Mullins, who slyly tweaks the noses of her undiplomatic suitors.  The independent-minded woman utters the famous retort, "Why don't you speak for yourself, John?" The saga has a surprise ending, one full of optimism for the American future.

Fictionalized history
A debate persists as to whether the tale is fact or fiction. Main characters Miles Standish, John Alden, and Priscilla Mullins are based upon real Mayflower passengers. Longfellow was a descendant of John Alden and Priscilla Mullins through his mother Zilpah Wadsworth and he claimed that he was relating oral history. Skeptics dismiss his narrative as a folktale. At minimum, Longfellow used poetic license, condensing several years of events. Scholars have confirmed the cherished place of romantic love in Pilgrim culture, and have documented the Indian war described by Longfellow. Miles Standish and John Alden were likely roommates in Plymouth; Priscilla Mullins was the only single woman of marriageable age in the young colony at that time and did in fact marry Alden. Standish's first wife, Rose Handley, died aboard the Mayflower in January 1621. Two years later, Standish married a woman named Barbara in Plymouth in 1623. The Standish and Alden families both moved from Plymouth to adjacent Duxbury, Massachusetts in the late 1620s, where they lived in close proximity, intermarried, and remained close for several generations. Upon his death in 1656, Standish's widow, Barbara, appointed John Alden to take inventory of Standish's estate.

Composition and publication history
The first reference to the poem recorded in Longfellow's journal is dated December 29, 1857, where the project is referred to as "Priscilla". By March 1 the next year, it was renamed The Courtship of Miles Standish.

The ballad was very popular in nineteenth-century America. It was published in book form on October 16, 1858, and it sold 25,000 copies after two months. Reportedly, 10,000 copies were sold in London in a single day.

Standish is memorialized in a low relief sculpture of six characters from Longfellow's epic poems executed by Daniel Chester French and installed at Longfellow Park, in Cambridge, Massachusetts, located in front of Longfellow's former home, now a U.S. National Historic Site maintained by the National Park Service.

Poetic meter
Courtship of Miles Standish is written in dactylic hexameter, the same meter used in classical epic poetry such as Homer's Iliad and Odyssey and Vergil's Aeneid. Longfellow used the same meter in his poem Evangeline.

Cultural references 
The story of Standish, Alden, and Mullins is referenced in A Charlie Brown Thanksgiving.

A 1940 Merrie Melodies cartoon depicts their own version of the story in The Hardship of Miles Standish.

See also
The Courtship of Miles Standish (1923 film)

References

External links

 The Courtship of Miles Standish, and Other Poems, 1858 edition, at books.google.com.
 — includes this poem.
Plot summary and historic background
 

1858 poems
American poems
Poetry by Henry Wadsworth Longfellow
Narrative poems
Plymouth Colony
Poems adapted into films